"On Fleek" is a 2019 French song by Eva featuring Lartiste. It was written by Youssef Akdim, Fabio Lancel, Gbalia Stan and Eva Garnier and produced by Fabio Lancel and Gbalia Stan. It topped the official French SNEP Singles Chart and also charted in Belgium.

Charts

Weekly charts

Year-end charts

Certifications

References

2019 singles
2019 songs
French-language songs
SNEP Top Singles number-one singles